Amber Joiner (born 1976) is an American politician who served as a member of the Nevada Assembly from 2014 to 2019. First appointed in 2014, she was elected to a full term in 2016. Joiner represents the 24th district, covering part of Reno.

Early life and education
Joiner was born in Reno, Nevada in 1976. She graduated from Robert McQueen High School, and then with a bachelor's degree from the University of Nevada, Reno and a master's degree from the University of Maryland.

Career 
Joiner previously served as deputy director of the Nevada Department of Health and Human Services.

In December 2014, Joiner was selected by the Washoe County Commission to replace David Bobzien in the Assembly. Bobzien had resigned in order to accept an appointment to the Reno City Council.

Joiner was elected to a full term in 2016, defeating Republican candidate Jim Riger. On November 27, 2017, Joiner announced she would not seek reelection in 2018.

Joiner supports the legalization of marijuana, and supports increased background checks for gun purchases.

Personal life
Joiner and her husband, Kyle, have two children, Eleanor and Stewart.

Electoral history

References

External links
 
 Campaign website
 Legislative website

1976 births
Living people
Democratic Party members of the Nevada Assembly
Politicians from Reno, Nevada
University System of Maryland alumni
University of Nevada, Reno alumni
Women state legislators in Nevada
21st-century American politicians
21st-century American women politicians